Romolo Mariano (born 18 December 1991) is an Italian  volleyball player, a member of the club Pool Libertas Cantù.

References

External links
 MoniniMarconiVolley profile
 LegaVolley profile
 Volleybox profile

1991 births
Living people
Italian men's volleyball players
Italian expatriate sportspeople in Switzerland
Sportspeople from Bergamo